Jessica Lee Rose (born April 26, 1987) is an American-New Zealand actress who first gained popularity after playing the role of lonelygirl15, a fictional teenage homeschooled character named Bree who appeared in YouTube video blogs, beginning in June 2006. The mystery surrounding the possible fictionality of her character led to an outing by the Los Angeles Times, which thrust her into the mainstream spotlight. In 2007, Rose won a Webby for this role.

After leaving lonelygirl15 in August 2007, Rose played "Jen K." on ABC Family's Greek. She went on to appear in various movies, such as Perfect Sport and SyFy's Ghost Town, and other web series, such as Hooking Up and Sorority Forever. She signed on to do the independent movie Look at Me with her Lonelygirl15 co-star Yousef Abu Taleb in March 2010.

Early life
Rose was born in Salisbury, Maryland, and moved to Mount Maunganui, Bay of Plenty, New Zealand when she was eight. She attended Mount Maunganui College in 2000–2003 for part of her secondary school education. Afterward she attended an acting class at Studio 111 in Auckland. In January 2004, she moved to Auckland to study at the Academy of Film and Television Make Up.

During the course of her studies, Rose's film career included doing make-up and costume work on a New Zealand short film titled Us, as well as doing extras' make-up on the set of Peter Jackson's King Kong. She played a leading role in a short film titled Dearly Beloved and played a supporting role in the short film Unleash the Fury.

After Rose's parents separated, she returned to Salisbury in May 2005 to live with her father. She then enrolled in the New York Film Academy (NYFA) at Universal Studios in Universal City, California.   In her search for acting jobs, she found a listing for an independent film project The Children of Anchor Cove on Craigslist. She auditioned for the lead part and was offered the role of Bree. Rose signed a non-disclosure agreement and was told that the project would consist of a series of videos released to the World Wide Web over the Internet. The idea concerned her at first, as she was afraid the project was pornography, but she was convinced otherwise and agreed to partake. Although initially unpaid, as lonelygirl15 grew popular, she and co-star Yousef Abu-Taleb received salaries.

YouTube fame

The lonelygirl15 video blogs, which first appeared in mid-2006, featured Rose as a 16-year-old girl named Bree posting under the alias lonelygirl15. The videos, which seemed genuine and presented lonelygirl15 as an actual person, initially dealt with typical teenage angst issues but soon after introduced a bizarre narrative surrounding secret occult practices within her family.  The series was an immediate hit and became the most subscribed channel on YouTube but suspicions arose as to whether the videos were genuine or some sort of a promotional gimmick.

An investigation by the Los Angeles Times would reveal the lonelygirl15 videos as a work of fiction. A firestorm ensued in the news media through September 2006 during which Rose and the creators of lonelygirl15 gained international attention and were interviewed by various magazines and television shows. In October 2006, the United Nations chose Rose via her character Bree to participate in an ad campaign to promote the UN's antipoverty cause.

In August 2007, Rose landed a role on Greek as "Jen K.", Rusty Cartwright's girlfriend.  On the show, her character referenced the actress's breakout role stating "It's like I'm living with lonelygirl15!"
"Weeping Willow", a sixth season episode of the television series Law & Order: Criminal Intent, was inspired by the lonelygirl15 videos.

On June 16, 2016, on the tenth anniversary of the series debut, Lonelygirl15 reappeared. The video has Bree reassuring an unnamed 15-year-old subject about being selected, as Bree had been.

Post-YouTube career
After her departure from lonelygirl15, Rose was signed by United Talent Agency and was cast in the ABC Family series Greek in the role of "Jen K" and the 2007 Chris Sivertson film I Know Who Killed Me, which starred Lindsay Lohan. She then played "Tina", an aspiring wrestler, in the award-winning sports drama Perfect Sport. In January 2009, Rose appeared in the music video for The White Tie Affair's song "Candle (Sick and Tired)," and the following October, she appeared in the Syfy television movie, Ghost Town.

On April 4, 2008, it was announced that she would star in a web television series called Blood Cell about "a young woman [who] must race against the clock to stop a sadistic madman after receiving a disturbing late-night phone call from a friend in danger." The series was released in October 2009 through theWB.com to little media fanfare. She also starred in another web series called Sorority Forever from Big Fantastic, the creators of Prom Queen. The series followed three incoming freshman in "the hottest sorority on campus" with some Gossip Girl and Veronica Mars elements to it. Additionally, she appeared in Hooking Up, a 10 episode web series from HBO featuring other recognized faces from the web including video bloggers sxePhil and KevJumba.

In November 2008, Rose teamed up with friend and fellow Sorority Forever star Taryn Southern to form a web production company called Webutantes, to potentially produce female-driven comedy web series. The two presented together at the 2009 Streamy Awards.

In 2009, Rose appeared in the web series Poor Paul, which is produced by former lonelygirl15 co-star Yousef Abu-Taleb and the second season of the web series The Crew. Aside from acting, she is an Anaheim Ducks fan and periodically blogs for NHL.com.

Rose reappeared as Bree on Lonelygirl15 in June 2016.

Personal life
In March 2016, Rose became engaged to her partner and fellow actor Tim Phillipps. They married at the Royal Melbourne Yacht Squadron in early 2017. She gave birth to their first child, a son, in September 2019.

Filmography

Web

Awards and recognitions
Streamy Awards
Nominated: Best Female Actor in a Dramatic Web Series (2009), Sorority Forever
VH1
Won: "Big Web Hit of 2006" (December 2006)
Won: Fourth biggest web star in their list of "40 Biggest Internet Celebrities." (March 2007)
Webby Awards
Won: Best Actress (2007), lonelygirl15
Additional recognitions
Won: Forbes magazine, Number One Web Celeb (January 2007)
Listed: Jane Magazine, 30 Inspirational Women Under 30 (May 2007)
Featured: Maxim, "Today's Girl on Maxim" (March 24, 2008)
Listed: VideoSurf, The Five Hottest Stars of Web Series (November 20, 2009)

References

External links

 
 Interview with MTV News (video)
 "Candle (Sick and Tired)" – music video by The White Tie Affair featuring Rose
 

1987 births
Living people
Actresses from Maryland
American film actresses
American web series actresses
American Internet celebrities
American television actresses
New Zealand television actresses
American emigrants to New Zealand
People from Mount Maunganui
People from Salisbury, Maryland
Video bloggers
Women video bloggers
New York Film Academy alumni
American women bloggers
American bloggers
21st-century American actresses
21st-century American women writers